Villa Mapelli Mozzi, also known as Villa  Mozzi or Villa Mapelli, is a large rural neoclassical-style palace in Locate Bergamasco, a frazione of Ponte San Pietro, which is located in the province of Bergamo, northern Italy.

History
The site originally held a castle, property of the Mozzi family, but the current villa was completed after 1770 by the count Enrico Mozzi.

The architect is not known definitively, but it could have been a local architect, Giovanni Moroni. He might have had suggestions from Giuseppe Piermarini, since the design is similar to that of the Royal Villa of Monza, and the peaked roof recalls his design for the Teatro alla Scala in Milan.

In 1820, Conte  D.  Luigi  Mozzi  was connected with the  "villa Mozzi, later Mapelli". The  property  remains  in the  possession  of the  Mapelli  Mozzi  family who also own the "sumptuous" Villa Mapelli Mozzi located in Casatenovo, between Bergamo and Lake Como.

Legacy
The interior of the Ponte San Pietro building has a large staircase leading to a piano nobile frescoed by Vincenzo Angelo Orelli, Paolo Vincenzo Bonomini, and Agostino Comerio.

References

External links

Villa Mapelli Mozzi – Isola Bergamasca website
Villa Mapelli Mozzi (in Casatenovo) – another Mapelli Mozzi family seat in Casatenovo, Italy
La famiglia Mapelli 

Mapelli Mozzi
Houses completed in 1780
Mapelli-Mozzi family